Oronero (English: Black Gold) is an album by Italian singer-songwriter Giorgia, released on 28 October 2016 by the record label Michroponica, and distributed by Sony Music. The album contains fifteen tracks, of which ten are co-written by Giorgia, plus numerous collaborations with Italian and international artists. The writers include the Italians Tony Maiello, Daniele Rea and Pacifico, as well as international collaborations with Allan Rich and Jud Friedman, who had written for Whitney Houston.

Track listing

 "Oronero" (Emanuel Lo) – 3:32
 "Danza" (lyrics: Giorgia; music: Bryce Fox, Pete Napp, Matta Iarad, Felicia Barton) – 3:16
 "Scelgo ancora te" (lyrics: Giorgia; music: James Morales, Matthew Morales, Julio David Rodriguez, Jana Ashley) – 3:26
 "Credo" (lyrics: Tony Maiello; music: Tony Maiello, Daniele Rea, Domenico Abate, Enrico Palmosi) – 2:56
 "Per non pensarti" (lyrics: Giorgia; music: Lucie Silvas, Tommy Lee James, Andrew Dorff) – 3:30
 "Vanità" (lyrics: Giorgia; music: Emma Rohan, Jez Ashurst) – 3:02
 "Posso farcela" (Giorgia) – 3:16
 "Come acrobati" (Emanuel Lo) – 3:13
 "Mutevole" (lyrics: Giorgia; music: Alessandro Barocchi, Marco Petriaggi) – 3:43
 "Tolto e dato" (Emanuel Lo) – 3:29
 "Amore quanto basta" (lyrics: Giorgia; music: Emanuel Lo) – 3:35
 "Sempre si cambia" (Gino Pacifico) – 3:34
 "Grande maestro" (lyrics: Giorgia; music: Michele Canova Iorfida, Sophie Hintze, Nikki Fiores) – 2:54
 "Regina di notte" (lyrics: Giorgia; music: Michele Canova Iorfida, Allan Rich, Jud Friedman, Giorgia) – 2:50
 "Non fa niente" (Giorgia) – 2:57

Charts

References

2016 albums
Giorgia (singer) albums